Gospel originally meant the Christian message ("the gospel"), but in the 2nd century it came to be used also for the books in which the message was reported. In this sense a gospel can be defined as a loose-knit, episodic narrative of the words and deeds of Jesus, culminating in his trial and death and concluding with various reports of his post-resurrection appearances. Modern biblical scholars are cautious of relying on the gospels uncritically, but nevertheless, they provide a good idea of the public career of Jesus, and critical study can attempt to distinguish the original ideas of Jesus from those of the later Christian authors.

The canonical gospels are the four which appear in the New Testament of the Bible. They were probably written between AD 66 and 110. All four were anonymous (with the modern names added in the 2nd century), almost certainly none were by eyewitnesses, and all are the end-products of long oral and written transmission. Mark was the first to be written, using a variety of sources. The authors of Matthew and Luke both independently used Mark for their narrative of Jesus's career, supplementing it with a collection of sayings called "the Q source", and additional material unique to each. There is near-consensus that John had its origins as the hypothetical Signs Gospel thought to have been circulated within a Johannine community. The contradictions and discrepancies between the first three and John make it impossible to accept both traditions as equally reliable. 

Many non-canonical gospels were also written, all later than the four canonical gospels, and like them advocating the particular theological views of their various authors. Important examples include the gospels of Thomas, Peter, Judas, and Mary; infancy gospels such as that of James (the first to introduce the perpetual virginity of Mary); and gospel harmonies such as the Diatessaron.

Etymology

Canonical gospels: Matthew, Mark, Luke and John

Contents

The four canonical gospels share the same basic outline of the life of Jesus: he begins his public ministry in conjunction with that of John the Baptist, calls disciples, teaches and heals and confronts the Pharisees, dies on the cross, and is raised from the dead. Each has its own distinctive understanding of him and his divine role and scholars recognize that the differences of detail between the gospels are irreconcilable, and any attempt to harmonize them would only disrupt their distinct theological messages. 

Matthew, Mark and Luke are termed the synoptic gospels because they present very similar accounts of the life of Jesus. Mark begins with the baptism of the adult Jesus and the heavenly declaration that he is the son of God; he gathers followers and begins his ministry, and tells his disciples that he must die in Jerusalem but that he will rise; in Jerusalem he is at first acclaimed but then rejected, betrayed, and crucified, and when the women who have followed him come to his tomb they find it empty. Mark never calls Jesus "God" or claims that he existed prior to his earthly life, apparently believes that he had a normal human parentage and birth, makes no attempt to trace his ancestry back to King David or Adam;  it originally ended at Mark 16:8 and had no post-resurrection appearances, although Mark 16:7, in which the young man discovered in the tomb instructs the women to tell "the disciples and Peter" that Jesus will see them again in Galilee, hints that the author knew of the tradition.

The authors of Matthew and Luke added infancy and resurrection narratives to the story they found in Mark, although the two differ markedly. Each also makes subtle theological changes to Mark: the Markan miracle stories, for example, confirm Jesus' status as an emissary of God (which was Mark's understanding of the Messiah), but in Matthew they demonstrate his divinity, and the "young man" who appears at Jesus' tomb in Mark becomes a radiant angel in Matthew.  Luke, while following Mark's plot more faithfully than Matthew, has expanded on the source, corrected Mark's grammar and syntax, and eliminated some passages entirely, notably most of chapters 6 and 7. 

John, the most overtly theological, is the first to make Christological judgements outside the context of the narrative of Jesus's life. He presents a significantly different picture of Jesus's career, omitting any mention of his ancestry, birth and childhood, his baptism, temptation and transfiguration; his chronology and arrangement of incidents is also distinctly different, clearly describing the passage of three years in Jesus's ministry in contrast to the single year of the synoptics, placing the cleansing of the Temple at the beginning rather than at the end, and the Last Supper on the day before Passover instead of being a Passover meal. The Gospel of John is the only gospel to call Jesus God, and in contrast to Mark, where Jesus hides his identity as messiah, in John he openly proclaims it.

Composition

Like the rest of the New Testament, the four gospels were written in Greek. The Gospel of Mark probably dates from c. AD 66–70, Matthew and Luke around AD 85–90, and John AD 90–110. Despite the traditional ascriptions, all four are anonymous and most scholars agree that none were written by eyewitnesses. A few conservative scholars defend the traditional ascriptions or attributions, but for a variety of reasons the majority of scholars have abandoned this view or hold it only tenuously.

In the immediate aftermath of Jesus' death his followers expected him to return at any moment, certainly within their own lifetimes, and in consequence there was little motivation to write anything down for future generations, but as eyewitnesses began to die, and as the missionary needs of the church grew, there was an increasing demand and need for written versions of the founder's life and teachings. The stages of this process can be summarised as follows:
 Oral traditions – stories and sayings passed on largely as separate self-contained units, not in any order;
 Written collections of miracle stories, parables, sayings, etc., with oral tradition continuing alongside these;
 Written proto-gospels preceding and serving as sources for the gospels – the dedicatory preface of Luke, for example, testifies to the existence of previous accounts of the life of Jesus.
 Gospels formed by combining proto-gospels, written collections and still-current oral tradition.

Mark is generally agreed to be the first gospel; it uses a variety of sources, including conflict stories (Mark 2:1–3:6), apocalyptic discourse (4:1–35), and collections of sayings, although not the sayings gospel known as the Gospel of Thomas and probably not the Q source used by Matthew and Luke. The authors of Matthew and Luke, acting independently, used Mark for their narrative of Jesus's career, supplementing it with the collection of sayings called the Q source and additional material unique to each called the M source (Matthew) and the L source (Luke). Mark, Matthew and Luke are called the synoptic gospels because of the close similarities between them in terms of content, arrangement, and language. The authors and editors of John may have known the synoptics, but did not use them in the way that Matthew and Luke used Mark. There is a near-consensus that this gospel had its origins as a "signs" source (or gospel) that circulated within the Johannine community (which produced John and the three epistles associated with the name) and later expanded with a Passion narrative as well as a series of discourses.

All four also use the Jewish scriptures, by quoting or referencing passages, or by interpreting texts, or by alluding to or echoing biblical themes. Such use can be extensive: Mark's description of the Parousia (second coming) is made up almost entirely of quotations from scripture. Matthew is full of quotations and allusions, and although John uses scripture in a far less explicit manner, its influence is still pervasive. Their source was the Greek version of the scriptures, called the Septuagint; they do not seem familiar with the original Hebrew.

Genre and historical reliability

The consensus among modern scholars is that the gospels are a subset of the ancient genre of bios, or ancient biography. Ancient biographies were concerned with providing examples for readers to emulate while preserving and promoting the subject's reputation and memory; the gospels were never simply biographical, they were propaganda and kerygma (preaching). As such, they present the Christian message of the second half of the first century AD, and as Luke's attempt to link the birth of Jesus to the census of Quirinius demonstrates, there is no guarantee that the gospels are historically accurate. 

The majority view among critical scholars is that the authors of Matthew and Luke have based their narratives on Mark's gospel, editing him to suit their own ends, and the contradictions and discrepancies between these three and John make it impossible to accept both traditions as equally reliable. In addition, the gospels we read today have been edited and corrupted over time, leading Origen to complain in the 3rd century that "the differences among manuscripts have become great, ... [because copyists] either neglect to check over what they have transcribed, or, in the process of checking, they make additions or deletions as they please". Most of these are insignificant, but many are significant, an example being Matthew 1:18, altered to imply the pre-existence of Jesus. For these reasons modern scholars are cautious of relying on the gospels uncritically, but nevertheless they do provide a good idea of the public career of Jesus, and critical study can attempt to distinguish the original ideas of Jesus from those of the later authors.

Scholars usually agree that John is not without historical value: certain of its sayings are as old or older than their synoptic counterparts, its representation of the topography around Jerusalem is often superior to that of the synoptics, its testimony that Jesus was executed before, rather than on, Passover, might well be more accurate, and its presentation of Jesus in the garden and the prior meeting held by the Jewish authorities are possibly more historically plausible than their synoptic parallels. Nevertheless, it is highly unlikely that the author had direct knowledge of events, or that his mentions of the Beloved Disciple as his source should be taken as a guarantee of his reliability.

Textual history and canonisation

The creation of a Christian canon was probably a response to the career of the heretic Marcion (c. 85–160), who established a canon of his own with just one gospel, the Gospel of Marcion, similar to the Gospel of Luke. The Muratorian canon, the earliest surviving list of books considered (by its own author at least) to form Christian scripture, included Matthew, Mark, Luke and John. Irenaeus of Lyons went further, stating that there must be four gospels and only four because there were four corners of the Earth and thus the Church should have four pillars.

Non-canonical (apocryphal) gospels

The many apocryphal gospels arose from the 1st century onward, frequently under assumed names to enhance their credibility and authority, and often from within branches of Christianity that were eventually branded heretical. They can be broadly organised into the following categories:
 Infancy gospels: arose in the 2nd century, include the Gospel of James, also called the Protoevangelium, which was the first to introduce the concept of the Perpetual Virginity of Mary, and the Infancy Gospel of Thomas (not to be confused with the unrelated Coptic Gospel of Thomas), both of which related many miraculous incidents from the life of Mary and the childhood of Jesus that are not included in the canonical gospels.
 Ministry gospels
 Sayings gospels and agrapha
 Passion, resurrection and post-resurrection gospels
 Gospel harmonies: in which the four canonical gospels are combined into a single narrative, either to present a consistent text or to produce a more accessible account of Jesus' life. 

The apocryphal gospels can also be seen in terms of the communities which produced them: 
 The Jewish-Christian gospels are the products of Christians of Jewish origin who had not given up their Jewish identity: they regarded Jesus as the messiah of the Jewish scripture, but did not agree that he was God, an idea which, although central to Christianity as it eventually developed, is contrary to Jewish beliefs.
 Gnostic gospels uphold the idea that the universe is the product of a hierarchy of gods, of whom the Jewish god is a rather low-ranking member. Gnosticism holds that Jesus was entirely "spirit", and that his earthly life and death were therefore only an appearance, not a reality. Many Gnostic texts deal not in concepts of sin and repentance, but with illusion and enlightenment.

See also

 Agrapha 
 Apocalyptic literature
 The Aquarian Gospel of Jesus the Christ
 Authorship of the Bible
 Bodmer Papyri
 Dating the Bible
 Fifth gospel (genre)
 The gospel
 Gospel (liturgy)
 Gospel harmony
 Gospel in Islam
 Gospel of Marcion
 Jesusism
 Jewish-Christian gospels

Notes

References

Citations

Bibliography

External links

 A detailed discussion of the textual variants in the gospels – covering about 1200 variants on 2000 pages.
 Greek New Testament – the Greek text of the New Testament: specifically the Westcott-Hort text from 1881, combined with the NA26/27 variants.
 Synoptic Parallels A web tool for finding corresponding passages in the Gospels

 
Books of Christian biography
Christian genres
Christian terminology
Greek-language books